Jebel (Cyrillic ) is a town in Balkan Province, Turkmenistan, that is subordinate to the city of Balkanabat. It is the nearest municipality to the Mollagara Sanitorium, which is four kilometers distant.

Etymology
Jebel means "mountain" in Arabic, and refers in this case to a nearby peak in the Balkhan Range.

Economy
Jebel serves as a support and logistics center for oil extraction operations in Balkan Province, particularly on the Cheleken Peninsula. It is also a center for mining and milling of table salt. In 2008 a kaolin plant was opened in Jebel. In 2011 Turkish Polimeks built Turkmenistan's largest cement plant in Jebel, capable of producing one million tons of cement per year. In 2014 a plant was opened for packaging medicinal mud and sea salt.

Archeological site
Four kilometers east of the Jebel train station in the Greater Balkhan range is the Jebel cave, in which A.P. Okladnikov found in 1949-1950 a multilayer archeological site dating from the Mesolithic through the Neolithic and Early Bronze ages.

Transportation
Jebel is the site of a municipal airport. The airport is scheduled for renovation and upgrading. The airport does not offer scheduled passenger service. Jebel is located at the junction of the M37 highway and the P-17 highway, which leads to the Cheleken Peninsula. The rail line between Türkmenbaşy and Ashgabat passes through Jebel, which has its own rail station.

Population

References

Balkan Region
Populated places in Turkmenistan